Carolina Day School is an independent, co-ed, college preparatory school serving grades pre-K through 12. The school is in the historic Biltmore Forest neighborhood of Asheville, North Carolina. It consists of a lower, middle, and upper school. 

Carolina Day School is a member of the North Carolina Association of Independent Schools and the National Association of Independent Schools.

History
Carolina Day School was founded in 1987 through the merger of Asheville Country Day School and St. Genevieve/Gibbons Hall. 

Asheville Country Day School, which thrived on the current campus, was established in 1936 as a private day school.

Established in 1908, St. Genevieve-of-the-Pines was a Catholic day and boarding school, which emphasized a strong foundation in the liberal arts. The St. Genevieve property was sold to Asheville-Buncombe Technical Community College when the schools merged in 1987.

References

External links 
Carolina Day School webpage
Satellite View of Campus from Google Maps

Private high schools in North Carolina
Educational institutions established in 1987
Schools in Buncombe County, North Carolina
Private middle schools in North Carolina
Private elementary schools in North Carolina
Preparatory schools in North Carolina
1987 establishments in North Carolina